Kettle Run High School is a public high school in Nokesville, Virginia.  The school is part of Fauquier County Public Schools and is located at 7403 Academic Avenue, Nokesville, VA. It has an enrollment of a little more than 1,200 students. The graduating class of 2015 consisted of 281 seniors. Kettle Run feeds into Mountain Vista Governor's School.

History
Kettle Run High School opened in 2008 as the third high school in Fauquier County, with students zoned for Kettle Run transferring from Fauquier High School and Liberty High School.  The location in the eastern part of the county is experiencing the highest rate of growth in the county.  In the first year of operation there was no senior class, making 2010 the first graduating class.

Accreditation
Kettle Run High School is fully accredited by the Virginia Department of Education and the Southern Association of Colleges and Schools.

Extracurricular
The mascot is a Cougar and the sports teams currently play in the AA Evergreen District and AA Region II. Kettle Run offers Competition Cheer, Cross Country, Field Hockey, Football, Golf, Volleyball, Basketball, Swimming, Winter Track, Track & Field, Wrestling, Baseball, Lacrosse, Soccer, Softball, and Tennis. In addition to physical sports, Kettle Run also offers Academic Team, Esports, and Model UN.

Kettle Run's marching band program has been around since the schools establishment in 2008, winning "Superior" awards nearly every year since 2008.

References

External links
 Kettle Run High School's official website
 Kettle Run HS official sports website
 Kettle Run HS official Band website
 Fauquier County Public Schools website

Public high schools in Virginia
Schools in Fauquier County, Virginia
Educational institutions established in 2008
2008 establishments in Virginia